Harry Wrightson (1874 – 29 January 1919) was a British Conservative politician. He was elected Member of Parliament (MP) for Leyton West in the 1918 General Election, but died before Parliament met.

Early life
Wrightson was born in 1874, the son of Reverend William Garmondsway Wrightson of The Old Hall, Hurworth-on-Tees. He was educated at Windlesham House School from 1885 to 1888 and afterwards at Marlborough College.

In 1901 he married Helen Western with whom he had four sons and a daughter.

Military service
Wrightson was commissioned into the 1st City of London Artillery Volunteer Corps in 1900. In 1917, during the First World War, he was promoted from a retired second lieutenant directly to lieutenant-colonel and given command of the Essex Motor Volunteer Corps, a unit formed of vehicle-owning volunteers.

Civilian and political career
In civilian life, Wrightson was an insurance underwriter and broker for Lloyd's of London.

He was elected Conservative MP for Leyton West in the 1918 General Election. Within days of the declaration, Wrightson contracted influenza, which deteriorated to pneumonia, and he died early in 1919, aged 44, six days before the new Parliament met. It is likely he was a victim of the Spanish flu pandemic. He thus became one of only a handful of elected British MPs never to have taken their seats.

Death
Wrightson died in his flat in Westminster on 29 January 1919.

See also
List of United Kingdom MPs with the shortest service

References

1874 births
1919 deaths
British Army personnel of World War I
Conservative Party (UK) MPs for English constituencies
Royal Army Service Corps officers
UK MPs 1918–1922
People educated at Windlesham House School
People educated at Marlborough College
Elected officials who died without taking their seats
People from Hurworth-on-Tees
Deaths from the Spanish flu pandemic in England